K. Subash (1959 – 23 November 2016), was an Indian director and screenwriter who directed Tamil and Hindi films. He is the son of R. Krishnan.

Career
K. Subash started his career as an assistant to Mani Ratnam in Nayakan. He made his directorial debut with Kaliyugam with Prabhu. His second film Chatriyan starring Vijayakanth was a blockbuster. He made Ayul Kaidhi, Vaakumoolam  and Uthama Purushan in the same period. He directed Pavithra with Ajithkumar. He directed another police drama Abhimanyu with Parthiban in lead role. He directed Ninaivirukkum Varai and Eazhaiyin Sirippil with Prabhu Deva. In 2000, he had planned a film starring comedian Vivek in a lead role titled Enakkenna Korachal?, though the film never materialized. Likewise, the following year, Subash launched a film titled Sarvaathigaari starring Arjun and Gajala, which was later shelved.

He again directed Sabhash with Parthiban. Subash then planned to act as the antagonist in a film titled Colombus featuring Raju Sundaram, but the project was stalled. He directed 123 with Prabhu Deva and his brothers which was Subash's last directorial in Tamil. He announced a project called Aayiram Poi Solli with Prabhu and Ramya Krishnan, the film was shelved after shooting few scenes while another film titled Sarvadhikari with Arjun also failed to proceed after its launch. He remade Telugu film Khadgam as Insan in Hindi with ensemble star cast featuring Akshay Kumar and Ajay Devgan. The film failed at box office and Subash opted against directing films and instead provided screenplay for Hindi film Sunday. Subhash had provided the story for Shahrukh Khan starrer Chennai Express.

Subhash has worked as the chief associate to Bollywood director Raj Kumar Santoshi in many films.

Death
Subash died on 23 November 2016 in SRM Hospital at Chennai. He was suffering from kidney failure and was on dialysis.

Filmography

Director

Writer
Sunday (Hindi)
Chennai Express (Hindi)
Entertainment (Hindi)
Dilwale (Hindi)
Housefull 3 (Hindi)

Actor
Chakkara Viyugam (2008)
Policegiri (2013) as Judge

Lyricist
Aaya Onnu, Kaathadikuthu, Thirupathi Ezhumalai (Ninaivirukkum Varai)
Husaine (Uyirile Kalandhadhu)
Kalakura, Paalai Keele (Sabhash)
Karu Karu, Yappa Yappa Ayyappa, Pachai Kallu (Ezhayin Sirippil)
Ceylon Singala Penne (Sanditha Velai)
Podava Kattina (Unnaruge Naanirunthal)
French Classile (Aasaiyil Oru Kaditham)

References

1959 births
2016 deaths
Hindi-language film directors
Tamil film directors
Screenwriters from Tamil Nadu
Hindi screenwriters
Tamil screenwriters
20th-century Indian film directors
21st-century Indian film directors